Nogometni klub Jadran Hrpelje-Kozina, commonly referred to as NK Jadran Hrpelje-Kozina, is a Slovenian football club from Kozina which plays in the Littoral League, the fourth highest league in Slovenia. The club was founded in 1976.

Honours

Littoral League (fourth tier)
 Winners: 1993–94, 2021–22

References

External links
Weltfussballarchiv profile

Association football clubs established in 1976
Football clubs in Slovenia
Football clubs in Yugoslavia
1976 establishments in Slovenia